Café Brauer (also known as the South Pond Refectory) is a restaurant building and official landmark located in Lincoln Park in Chicago, Illinois, at the edge of the Lincoln Park Zoo. It was designed by Dwight H. Perkins and completed in 1908.

The building, known for its green roof, red bricks, second floor ballroom, and lagoon-side setting, has been called "an outstanding example of the Prairie School of architecture" and "perhaps the finest expression of Perkins' design philosophy". It was financed by the Brauer family of Chicago, who worked in the restaurant business, and was one of the most popular restaurants in Chicago during the early twentieth century. Caspar Brauer, who died at age 68 on April 29, 1940, was the longtime proprietor of Cafe Brauer.

The original restaurant closed in the 1940s. In 1947, Cafe Brauer's second floor ballroom was opened to the public as an indoor recreation room featuring ballroom dancing for children, square dancing, and waltzing. At the time, it was announced that the facility would be renamed the Lincoln Fieldhouse. By the 1960s, the structure was largely used for storage. Part of the second floor was used as a theater, and there was a small cafeteria on the first floor.  A nine-member committee was chosen on October 10, 1967 by Chicago Park Board Vice-President Daniel Shannon to look into restoring the structure as a restaurant-ballroom and adding an outdoor dance pavilion. Their project never moved forward because of restrictions on the sale of alcohol in park district facilities.

In 1987, the Lincoln Park Zoo Society began a $4.2 million restoration project. The second floor ballroom was renovated so that it could be used for private events, and the first floor was remodeled as a small family restaurant and ice cream parlor.

Cafe Brauer was listed on the National Register of Historic Places in 1986, and it received Chicago Landmark status on February 5, 2003.

The building is located on the site of the South Pond Refectory, a wood-frame boathouse and restaurant designed by William Le Baron Jenney which was open from 1882 until 1908. Café Brauer is sometimes called the South Pond Refectory, the primary name for the site used in its National Register nomination.

Gallery

References

Chicago Landmarks
Commercial buildings completed in 1908
Commercial buildings on the National Register of Historic Places in Chicago
1908 establishments in Illinois